The World Fantasy Awards are given each year by the World Fantasy Convention for the best fantasy fiction published in English during the previous calendar year. The awards have been described by book critics such as The Guardian as a "prestigious fantasy prize", and one of the three most prestigious speculative fiction awards, along with the Hugo and Nebula Awards (which cover both fantasy and science fiction). The World Fantasy Award—Anthology is given each year for anthologies of fantasy stories by multiple authors published in English. An anthology can have any number of editors, and works in the anthology may have been previously published; awards are also given out for collections of works by a single author in the Collection category. The Anthology category has been awarded annually since 1988, though from 1977 through 1987 anthologies were admissible as nominees in the Collection category. During the ten years they were admissible for that category they won the award seven times and represented 38 of the 56 nominations.

World Fantasy Award nominees and winners are decided by attendees and judges at the annual World Fantasy Convention. A ballot is posted in June for attendees of the current and previous two conferences to determine two of the finalists, and a panel of five judges adds three or more nominees before voting on the overall winner. The panel of judges is typically made up of fantasy authors and is chosen each year by the World Fantasy Awards Administration, which has the power to break ties. The final results are presented at the World Fantasy Convention at the end of October. Winners were presented with a statue in the form of a bust of H. P. Lovecraft through the 2015 awards; more recent winners receive a statuette of a tree.

During the 35 nomination years, 128 editors have had works nominated; 39 of them have won, including co-editors. Only four editors have won more than once. Ellen Datlow has won 8 times out of 37 nominations, the most of any editor; Terri Windling has won 6 times out of 18 nominations, all of the nominations as a co-editor with Datlow; Jeff VanderMeer has two wins each out of seven nominations, with both wins and five nominations shared with Ann VanderMeer;  Jack Dann has won twice out of five nominations; and Dennis Etchison has won twice out of three nominations. After Datlow and Windling, the editors with the most nominations are Stephen Jones, who has won once out of fifteen nominations, Gardner Dozois, who has won once out of seven nominations, and David Sutton and Martin H. Greenberg, who each have been nominated six times without winning. Seventeen editors in total have been nominated more than twice.

Winners and nominees
In the following table, the years correspond to the date of the ceremony, rather than when the anthology was first published. Each year links to the corresponding "year in literature". Entries with a blue background and an asterisk (*) next to the editor's name have won the award; those with a white background are the other nominees on the shortlist.

  *   Winners

References

External links
 World Fantasy Convention official site

Awards established in 1988
Anthology
Anthology awards